Eagle Fighting Championship (EFC), commonly referred to as Eagle FC, is a Russian mixed martial arts promotion company established in 2020 by former UFC Lightweight Champion Khabib Nurmagomedov. It was renamed to Eagle Fighting Championship (EFC) after Nurmagomedov bought Gorilla Fighting Championship (GFC) for $1 million.

History
In November 2020, Khabib Nurmagomedov bought the Russian MMA promotion Gorilla Fighting Championship (formerly known as Federation of MMA of Samara), for $1 million and renamed it to Eagle Fighting Championship (EFC).

GFC had been in the industry since 2017 and was on the edge of bankruptcy. When Nurmagomedov retired, he acquired the promotion and became the promoter.

EFC held their first event in the USA on January 28, 2022 in Miami, Florida.

Weight divisions

Events

Scheduled events

Past events

Current champions

Championship history

Heavyweight Championship
206 to 265 lb (93 to 120 kg)

Light Heavyweight Championship
186 to 205 lb (84 to 93 kg)

Middleweight Championship
171 to 185 lb (77 to 84 kg)

Welterweight Championship
166 to 175 lb (75 to 79 kg)

Lightweight Championship
146 to 155 lb (66 to 70 kg)

Featherweight Championship
136 to 145 lb (61 to 66 kg)

Bantamweight Championship
126 to 135 lb (57 to 61 kg)

Flyweight Championship
116 to 125 lb (53 to 57 kg)

Women's divisions (defunct)

Women's Bantamweight Championship
 to

Women's Flyweight Championship
 to

Notable athletes and alumni
 Diego Sanchez: Former UFC Lightweight Championship Contender. TUF 1 Middleweight Tournament Winner.  Former KOTC Welterweight Champion.

 Kevin Lee: Former UFC interim Lightweight Championship Contender
 Renan Barão: Former UFC Bantamweight Champion
 Rashad Evans: Former UFC Light Heavyweight Champion
 Antônio Silva: Former UFC Heavyweight Fighter
Junior dos Santos: Former UFC Heavyweight Champion
 Ray Borg: Former UFC Flyweight Title Challenger
 Umar Nurmagomedov: Current UFC Bantamweight and cousin of Eagle FC founder Khabib Nurmagomedov. Ex-Combat Sambo Champion (Not FIAS) & former Bantamweight Champion of GFC
 Usman Nurmagomedov: Current Bellator Lightweight Champion. Cousin of Khabib Nurmagomedov and younger brother of Umar Nurmagomedov.
 Tagir Ulanbekov: Current UFC Flyweight and former Flyweight Champion of GFC. Ex-World Combat Sambo Champion (Not FIAS).

Reference

Mixed martial arts organizations